Elimia livescens, common name the liver elimia, is a species of freshwater snail with an operculum, an aquatic gastropod mollusk in the family Pleuroceridae.

Shell description 
The height of the shell of this species can be as large as 20 mm.

Distribution 
Elimia livescens is native to the United States. It occurs in the Saint Lawrence River drainage from Great Lake to Lake Champlain; in tributaries of the Ohio River east of the Scioto River in Ohio; and in the Wabash River, west to the Illinois River.

The nonindigenous distribution of Elimia livescens includes the lower Hudson River drainage. It migrated to the Hudson River via the Erie Canal. The impact of this introduction is unknown.

Ecology

Habitat 
This snail is found in freshwater rivers and streams, on rock shoals and gravel bars.

Life cycle 
The sexes are separate. Eggs are usually laid in the spring. The snails often reach sexual maturity in a year, and can live for 5 years.

Parasites
Parasites of Elimia livescens include trematode Aspidogaster conchicola.

References
This article incorporates public domain text from the reference

Further reading 
 
 

livescens